James Beverly Langford (April 11, 1922 – April 14, 1996) was an American lawyer and politician.

Biography
Langford was born in Calhoun, Georgia and graduated from Calhoun High School. He served in the United States Army during World War II. He received his law degree from the University of Georgia School of Law in 1947. He practiced law in Calhoun, Georgia and was also involved in the banking business. Langford also raised cattle. He served on the local school board. Langford served in the Georgia Senate from 1973 to 1980 and was a Democrat. He then served in the Georgia House of Representatives from 1987 to 1992. Langford helped Jimmy Carter with his Georgia gubernatorial campaigns in 1966 and 1970. He served on the Georgia State Transportation Board from 1993 until his death in 1996. Langford died at Blaircliff Haven Nursing Home in Atlanta, Georgia.

Family
His wife was Edna Snyder Langford and their grandson was Jason Carter who also served in the Georgia General Assembly. Jason Carter's parents were his father Jack Carter, the son of President Jimmy Carter and Rosalynn Carter and Judy Langford Carter, the daughter of James Beverly and Edna Langford.

Notes

External links

1922 births
1996 deaths
People from Calhoun, Georgia
Military personnel from Georgia (U.S. state)
University of Georgia School of Law alumni
Georgia (U.S. state) lawyers
Businesspeople from Georgia (U.S. state)
Farmers from Georgia (U.S. state)
School board members in Georgia (U.S. state)
Democratic Party Georgia (U.S. state) state senators
Democratic Party members of the Georgia House of Representatives
Jimmy Carter
United States Army personnel of World War II
Calhoun High School alumni